Crane Township is one of the twelve townships of Paulding County, Ohio, United States.  The 2000 census found 1,530 people in the township, 1,314 of whom lived in the unincorporated portions of the township.

Geography
Located in the northern part of the county, it borders the following townships:
Mark Township, Defiance County - north
Delaware Township, Defiance County - northeast corner
Emerald Township - east
Jackson Township - southeast corner
Paulding Township - south
Harrison Township - southwest corner
Carryall Township - west
Hicksville Township, Defiance County - northwest corner

The village of Cecil is located in northeastern Crane Township.

Name and history
Crane Township was named for Oliver Crane, a pioneer settler. Statewide, the only other Crane Township is located in Wyandot County.

Government
The township is governed by a three-member board of trustees, who are elected in November of odd-numbered years to a four-year term beginning on the following January 1. Two are elected in the year after the presidential election and one is elected in the year before it. There is also an elected township fiscal officer, who serves a four-year term beginning on April 1 of the year after the election, which is held in November of the year before the presidential election. Vacancies in the fiscal officership or on the board of trustees are filled by the remaining trustees.

References

External links
County website

Townships in Paulding County, Ohio
Townships in Ohio